

Events

January events
 January 1
 William Stanier succeeds Ernest Lemon as Chief Mechanical Engineer of the London, Midland and Scottish Railway.
 Ralph Budd leaves the Great Northern Railway and becomes president of the Chicago, Burlington and Quincy Railroad.

March events
 March 15 - The last passenger service run of the Pontchartrain Rail-Road, in operation for over a century.
 March 24 - The first radio broadcast from a moving train occurs when New York City station WABC broadcasts from a Baltimore and Ohio Railroad train operating in Maryland.
 March 31 – Tokyo Yokohama Electric Railway Line, from Shibuya Station in Tokyo via Musashi-Kosugi Station in Kawasaki, Kanagawa to Sakuragichō Station in Yokohama, is officially completed in Japan (as predecessor of Tokyu Toyoko Line).

April events
 April 20 - The first completely air-conditioned sleeping car trains begins operating on the Baltimore and Ohio Railroad.
 April - The Atlantic City Railroad (predecessor to the Pennsylvania-Reading Seashore Lines) purchases the Stone Harbor Railroad.

May events
 May 24 - Nigerian Government Railways complete the 787 m (861 yd) road–rail Benue Bridge at Makurdi on its Eastern Line, replacing a train ferry.

June events

August events
 August 20 - The Unanderra – Moss Vale railway line of the New South Wales Government Railways in Australia is opened.
 August 31 – Pacific Electric Arrowhead Line service is discontinued.

September events
 September 10 - The IND Eighth Avenue Line, at this time the world's longest subway line, begins operation in Manhattan.
 September 11 - Canadian operations end on the International Railway (New York – Ontario).

December events
 December 6 – Nippo Line, Kokura of Kitakyushu via Oita to Kagoshima route officially completed in Kyushu Island, Japan.
 December 29 - “Twentieth Century” a play by Hecht and MacArthur about the New York Central Railroad's 20th Century Limited opens on Broadway.
 December 31 - The last steam-powered Southern Belle passenger train operates on the Southern Railway; the train's equipment will be replaced with electric multiple unit cars the next day.

Unknown date events
 The Southern Pacific Railroad gains 87% control of the Cotton Belt Railroad (St. Louis Southwestern Railway).
 Angus Daniel McDonald succeeds Paul Shoup as president of the Southern Pacific Company, parent company of the Southern Pacific Railroad.
 Hale Holden steps down as Chairman of the Executive Committee for the Southern Pacific Company. With Holden's departure, this position is eliminated. Holden then assumes the position of Chairman of the Board of Directors for the company.
 The Atchison, Topeka and Santa Fe Railway reduces train frequencies on its subsidiary Grand Canyon Railway from twice daily to once daily.
 The Lake Shore Electric Railway in Ohio declares bankruptcy.
 New Zealand Railways introduces K class 4-8-4 steam locomotives built in its Hutt Workshops.
 First Franco-Crosti boilered locomotive built, Belgian State Railways No 2096, an 0-6-2+2-4-2-4-2+2-6-0 articulated.
 An electric Children's railway operates in Gorky Park (Moscow), Soviet Union.

Accidents

Deaths

March deaths
 March 7 - William N. Page, American civil engineer who built the Chesapeake and Ohio Railway and the Virginian Railway (born 1854).

References